Minoa was a town on the north coast of ancient Crete on the Cisamun promontory (now Akrotiri).

The site of Minoa is located near modern Marathi.

References

Populated places in ancient Crete
Former populated places in Greece